Free is the sixth studio album by Negativland. In the wake of leaving SST Records,  Negativland revived their self-owned Seeland Records label, signed a distribution deal  with Mordam Records, and released this album. The main topics are about liberty, the media, and what it means to be free. "Free" has found sounds, stories, and songs about a well-known convenience store, torture, the quality of urban life, Cadillacs, firearms, the bible, interstate trucking, geriatric discomfort, big dogs, bicycle safety, alcohol consumption, driving in circles, death, organ buttons, religious dialectics, and the truth about The Star-Spangled Banner.

Track listing
"Freedom's Waiting" – 2:21
"Cityman" – 5:56
"The Gun and the Bible" – 2:48
"Truck Stop Drip Drop" – 4:00
"The Bottom Line" – 3:25
"Crumpled Farm" – 4:23
"Happy the Harmonica" – 10:01 (Cover of a piece by Frank Luther )
"Pip Digs Pep" – 4:51
"We Are Driven" – 7:04
"View to the Sun" – 3:58
"I Am God" – 5:19
"Our National Anthem" – 4:51

External links
Free on the Negativland official discography.
[ Free] entry at Allmusic.

1993 albums
Negativland albums